Mashallah (also Ma sha Allah) is an Islamic phrase that expresses appreciation, joy, praise, or thankfulness. It may refer to:

People
Mashallah Abdullayev (born 1950), Azerbaijani military serviceman
Mashallah Amin Sorour (1931–2010), Iranian cyclist
Mashallah ibn Athari (c.740–815), Persian astronomer
Mashallah Shamsolvaezin, Iranian journalist
Mashalla Ahmadov (born 1959), Azerbaijani footballer

Other
Mashaallah (horse)

See also
Inshallah (disambiguation)

Arabic masculine given names